Dublin Independent School District is a public school district based in Dublin, Texas. Located in southwestern Erath County, a small portion of the district extends into Comanche County.

In 2009, the school district was rated "academically acceptable" by the Texas Education Agency.

Schools
Dublin High School (grades 7-12)
Dublin Intermediate (grades 4-6)
Dublin Elementary (prekindergarten-grade 3)

References

External links
Dublin ISD

School districts in Erath County, Texas
School districts in Comanche County, Texas